The 10th Golden Globe Awards, honoring the best in film for 1952 films, were held on February 26, 1953, at the Ambassador Hotel (Los Angeles) in Los Angeles.

Winners and Nominees

Best Motion Picture – Drama
 The Greatest Show on Earth 
Come Back, Little Sheba
The Happy Time
High Noon
The Thief

Best Motion Picture – Comedy or Musical
 With a Song in My Heart 
Hans Christian Andersen
I'll See You in My Dreams
Singin' in the Rain
Stars and Stripes Forever

Best Performance by an Actor in a Motion Picture – Drama
 Gary Cooper – High Noon 
Charles Boyer – The Happy Time
Ray Milland – The Thief

Best Performance by an Actress in a Motion Picture – Drama
 Shirley Booth – Come Back, Little Sheba 
Joan Crawford – Sudden Fear
Olivia de Havilland – My Cousin Rachel

Best Performance by an Actor in a Motion Picture – Comedy or Musical
 Donald O'Connor – Singin' in the Rain 
Danny Kaye – Hans Christian Andersen 
Clifton Webb – Stars and Stripes Forever

Best Performance by an Actress in a Motion Picture – Comedy or Musical
 Susan Hayward – With a Song in My Heart 
Katharine Hepburn – Pat and Mike
Ginger Rogers – Monkey Business

Best Performance by an Actor in a Supporting Role in a Motion Picture
 Millard Mitchell – My Six Convicts 
Kurt Kasznar – The Happy Time
Gilbert Roland – The Bad and the Beautiful

Best Performance by an Actress in a Supporting Role in a Motion Picture
 Katy Jurado – High Noon 
Mildred Dunnock – Viva Zapata!
Gloria Grahame – The Bad and the Beautiful

Best Direction – Motion Picture
 Cecil B. DeMille – The Greatest Show on Earth 
Richard Fleischer – The Happy Time
John Ford – The Quiet Man

Best Screenplay – Motion Picture
 5 Fingers – Michael Wilson 
High Noon – Carl Foreman
The Thief – Clarence Greene and Russell Rouse

Best Music, Original Score – Motion Picture
 High Noon – Dimitri Tiomkin 
Ivanhoe – Miklós Rózsa
The Quiet Man – Victor Young

Cinematography – Black and White
 High Noon  
The Four Poster
The Thief

Cinematography – Color
 The Greatest Show on Earth – George Barnes; J. Peverell Marley

Promoting International Understanding
 Anything Can Happen 
Assignment: Paris
Ivanhoe

Special Achievement Award
Francis Kee Teller

Henrietta Award (World Film Favorites)
 Susan Hayward  and John Wayne

Cecil B. DeMille Award
 Walt Disney 
Stanley Kramer
Adolph Zukor

New Star of the Year Actor
 My Cousin Rachel – Richard Burton 
Pat and Mike – Aldo Ray
Star and Stripes Forever – Robert Wagner

New Star of the Year Actress
 Moulin Rouge – Colette Marchand 
The Thief – Rita Gam
High Noon – Katy Jurado

Juvenile Performance
 The Member of the Wedding – Brandon deWilde 
Navajo – Francis Kee Teller
My Pal Gus – George Winslow

References

010
1952 film awards
1952 television awards
February 1953 events in the United States